The Hollywood Music in Media Award for Best Main Title Theme – TV Show/Limited Series is one of the awards given annually to composers working in the television industry by the Hollywood Music in Media Awards (HMMA). It is presented to the musicians who have composed the best score, written specifically for a television series, or limited series. The award was first given in 2014, during the fifth annual awards.

Winners and nominees

2010s
Best Original Score – TV Show/Digital Streaming Series

Best Original Score – TV Show/Miniseries

Best Original Score – TV Show/Limited Series

2020s

References

Awards established in 2014